Verkhnesanzyapovo (Ürge Sanyap) is a rural locality (a selo) and the administrative centre of Sanzyapovsky Selsoviet, Kugarchinsky District, Bashkortostan, Russia. The population was 234 as of 2010. There are 3 streets.

Geography 
Verkhnesanzyapovo is located 41 km southwest of Mrakovo (the district's administrative centre) by road. Kaskinovo is the nearest rural locality.

References 

Rural localities in Kugarchinsky District